The Minolta X-700 is a 35 mm single-lens reflex film camera introduced by Minolta in 1981. It was the top model of their final manual-focus SLR series before the introduction of the auto-focus Minolta Maxxum 7000.

Features
The X-700 used the basic body of the XG-M with electronically controlled stepless speeds, but added full program autoexposure in addition to the XG-M's aperture priority and metered manual modes. This program mode was referred to as "MPS" or Minolta Program System. 

It also introduced through-the-lens (TTL) off the film flash metering in Aperture Priority or Program mode, which adjusted exposure and flash output automatically to produce a perfect exposure, without the user having to adjust anything at all, and added exposure lock and interchangeable focusing screens to the XG-M's features. The X-700 was aimed to appeal to the widest range of photographers possible. Its easy to use fully automated Program mode could turn it into a point-and-shoot that anybody could use, but its wide array of advanced features and available accessories and lenses made it appealing to professionals alike. 

Minolta later launched various other models based on the X-700 chassis: X-300 (X-370 for the North American market), X-300S, X-300N, X-500 (X-570 for the North American market) and X-600. The X-500 (X-570 in the North American market) lacked the X-700's program exposure mode and exposure compensation dial, but addressed one of the main complaints of X-700 users: the X-700 in fully manual mode only showed the recommended shutter speed by the meter in the viewfinder. This meant that to actually see what shutter speed was selected, the user had to take their eye off the viewfinder. Despite it being a small detail, many photographers preferred the X-500/570 which in fully manual mode showed both the recommended shutter speed and the selected one in the viewfinder. The X-500/570 also offered slower flash sync speeds than 1/60 of a second. 

  The X-300 also released in 1983 was the most basic model of X-series bodies. It lacked TTL flash metering, program exposure mode and the depth of field preview button, and it did not display the f-stop-setting of the lens in the viewfinder. Basic parts of all three cameras, such as the shutter, viewfinder, mirror system, and light metering system, were identical.

Motivated by the huge success of the low-priced Canon AE-1 and other consumer-level cameras, Minolta followed suit in the new camera's design by offering a wide array of optional equipment, with the X-700 being the base of the "Minolta Program System" such as flashes, film winders, motor drives, data backs, multi function backs, power grips, wireless controllers etc.  This lowered the budget for the camera's internal mechanism.  In a step backwards, the new X-700 was not equipped with the fast vertical metal shutter of previous XE and XD cameras, and was instead fitted with a less expensive horizontal traverse silk shutter, enabling maximum sync speed of 1/60 second, and operated by an electromagnetic shutter release.  No mechanical shutter speed was provided, even in bulb mode.  The resultant battery drain and inability to meter at light levels below EV-1 made the camera a poor choice for long exposures, as often needed for astrophotography.  Minolta further lowered the price of the camera by fabricating certain parts in the film advance and rewind mechanism of less expensive materials, and by the use of less expensive electronic components.  Even the rewind lever of the camera is made of plastic.

History
In 1981, the X-700 was awarded the European "Camera of the Year". Its competitive pricing resulted in its becoming the most successful Minolta camera since the SRT line.

In 1985 Minolta came out with their first autofocus cameras with the Maxxum / Alpha / Dynax series of cameras. This meant that further research and development of manual-focus 35mm SLR cameras was shelved and production of MF SR mount lenses and bodies was outsourced to a certain extent.  Some internal components of the X-700 were changed over its long 18 year production run, such as the shutter capacitor which on early models was made from tantalum. Later on, due to rising costs of tantalum, Minolta decided to use cheaper materials which had the negative effect of stopping the shutter from firing. This fault also affects other X- series cameras, however the capacitor is easily replaced.  Minolta was also one of the first major 35mm SLR manufacturer to outsource assembly of its cameras to countries outside Japan.  They moved production of their X-300 to China in 1990, where the Seagull Camera factory took over production.

In 1999, after 18 years in production, the X-700 was discontinued.

References

Bibliography
Rokkor, Antony (2006-04-26). X-700. The Rokkor Files, 26 April 2006. Retrieved on 2005-11-27 from http://www.rokkorfiles.com/X-700.html.
German instruction. Minolta X-700. Retrieved from https://web.archive.org/web/20100708160813/http://www.design-weblounge.de/kameras-filme/minolta-x-700/.

External links

135 film cameras
X-700
Cameras introduced in 1981